Ruvo del Monte is a town and comune in the province of Potenza, in the region of Basilicata. It is bounded by the comuni of Atella, Calitri, Rapone, Rionero in Vulture, San Fele.

References

Cities and towns in Basilicata